Rimma Vasilyevna Komina  was a Soviet and Russian specialist in literary criticism, Doctor of Philology, professor (1985), dean of the philological faculty at Perm State University (1977–1982), the author of handbook "Contemporary Soviet literature" (1984), one of the key people in cultural life in Perm in the 1970s and 1980s. Her famous students are Jury Belikov and Boris Kondakov.

Sources
 Rimma Komina at Russian Wikipedia: Комина, Римма Васильевна // Википедия, свободная энциклопедия.

References

1926 births
1995 deaths
Philologists
Women philologists
Moscow State University alumni
Academic staff of Perm State University
Soviet literary historians
Women literary historians